Christopher Stephen Peter “Bash” Bashinelli is an American actor, producer, explorer, and television host. He is best known as the executive producer and host of the television series, Bridge the Gap, which currently airs on PBS  and the National Geographic channel. Bashinelli is also known for being one of the youngest people  to ever moderate an event at the United Nations General Assembly Hall.

Early life
Christopher Bashinelli was born on November 10, 1986 to Stephen and Florence Bashinelli, who are, respectively, of Italian and Lebanese descent. Chris was born and raised in the Bay Ridge neighborhood of Brooklyn, New York  and attended Xaverian High School. He attended Marymount Manhattan College and graduated in 2008 with a BA in Theatre Arts.

Acting career
Bashinelli has appeared on television (The Sopranos, 2007) and in several films: How to Grow a Fig Tree (2007), Knock Knock (2007), Last Day of Summer (2009), Good Shot Bash (2009), Take Off (2009), and All Screwed Up (2009).

United Nations
In 2010 Bashinelli moderated the Launch of the International Year of Youth in the United Nations General Assembly Hall with the UN Secretary General, Ban Ki-moon. In 2011, at 24 years old, Bashinelli became the youngest male to moderate the United Nations International Day of Peace.

Bridge the Gap

In 2007, at age 20 Bashinelli went to Tanzania as a part of a study abroad program. When he returned he developed the documentary short, Bridge the Gap: Tanzania (2009), in an attempt to show a positive view of Tanzania and its people.  This film premiered at the Zanzibar International Film Festival in Tanzania in 2009.

Following the completion of Bridge the Gap: Tanzania, Bashinelli launched the production company Bridge the Gap TV. Bridge the Gap TV focuses on telling the stories of everyday life in a positive way from areas around the world that often receive negative media attention.

Bridge the Gap TV has produced four episodes of the Bridge the Gap series in addition to Tanzania that are currently airing on PBS and the National Geographic Channel (3). Episodes include Pine Ridge Indian Reservation, Haiti, Uganda and Mongolia.

National Geographic Young Explorer
In 2012 Bashinelli was named a National Geographic Young Explorer, which awards grants to help fund projects “supporting new generations of archaeologists, anthropologists, astronomers, conservationists, ecologists, geographers, geologists, marine scientists, adventurers, storytellers, and pioneers.” Bashinelli used his grant to help fund Bridge the Gap to Mongolia, where he lived as a nomad.

Filmography

References

American television producers
Living people
American people of Italian descent
American male actors
American people of Lebanese descent
Year of birth missing (living people)